William Albert Beller (19 July 1900, in Burlington, Wisconsin – 20 February 1986) was an American concert pianist and professor of music at Marquette University and Columbia University.  He was deemed a musical prodigy when he was 4 years old.  He had also taught piano at the Bronx House Music School in the 1930s.

Formal training 
In 1916, Beller won scholarship at the Chicago Musical College, where, in 1917, he received a Senior Diploma with the Diamond Medal for Excellence in Scholarship.  In 1918, he received a Graduate Medal; and in 1921, a Bachelor of Music degree with a prize of a grand piano.  At some point (upon one of his graduations) he received a gold medal.

Beller studied piano (i) 2 years with Arthur L.J. Frazier (1881–1973), (ii) with Howard Wells in Chicago, (iii) with Tobias Matthay and, (iv) in 1926, with Josef Lhevinne in New York under a Juilliard fellowship.

Concert work in New York 
When Beller arrived in New York, he was represented by NBC Artists Service (aka National Broadcasting and Concert Bureau), George W. Engles (1890–1963), managing director, RCA Building, New York City.

Teaching positions 
 1930–1935 (summers) — As a visiting professor, Beller taught piano in Dallas (Dallas Conservatory of Music and Fine Arts), Denton (Texas Woman's University), and Fort Worth (Fort Worth Conservatory) during the summers.  The Dallas Conservatory was essentially a collection of music teachers led by Carl Wiesemann in the 1930s who taught from the Terrill School.
 1934 (summer) — Beller and Joseph Brinkman (1901–1960) gave a four-week series of lecture-recitals on Bach, Haydn, Mozart, Beethoven, Schubert, Schumann, Chopin, Brahms, Debussy, and Ravel as part of a graduate seminar at the University of Michigan
 1919–?? — Professor, Marquette University Conservatory of Music (organized as a conservatory in 1911).
 Fall 1941–?? — Faculty member, and eventually chairman of the piano department, Columbia University

Beller also taught piano in Hartford, Ann Arbor, and Chicago.  Beller also maintained a private studio at Carnegie Hall.

Students 
Columbia University
 Kenneth Lee Ascher (jazz pianist, composer)
 Mark Paul Malkovich III (born 1930), (concert pianist, chamber music expert)
 Michael Shapiro, (BA, CC 1962)
 Joelle Wallach (studied with Beller while working on her masters at Columbia University from 1966 to 1971)

Private lessons (outside of Columbia)
 Don Friedman (jazz pianist, music educator) – studied with Beller from 1960 to 1961

Honors 
 1925 — Winner, Piano, National Federation of Music Clubs.  Each biennium, the Wisconsin Federation of Music Clubs sponsored a contest for young artists and student musicians, in all classes of music, piano, voice, violin, organ, and cello. The winners of the contest compete with winners of the same contest from Illinois, Iowa and Nebraska; and the winners from that district appear in the finals at the meeting of the National Federation, a composed of twelve districts of the United States.  Beller won the National competition in Portland, Oregon, which included a $500 prize.
 1925 — Winner, Mason and Hamlin Prize, thereupon presented as soloist with the Chicago Symphony Orchestra
 1926 — Awarded a Juilliard Fellowship with Josef Lhévinne

The Chicago days 
In 1925, while in Chicago, Beller worked for Lyon & Healy and was a Duo-Art artist.

References 

Columbia University faculty
American classical pianists
American male classical pianists
Musicians from Chicago
Musicians from Wisconsin
1900 births
1986 deaths
Marquette University faculty
People from Burlington, Wisconsin
20th-century classical pianists
20th-century American pianists
Classical musicians from New York (state)
Classical musicians from Illinois
Classical musicians from Wisconsin
20th-century American male musicians